The following is a list of wars involving Uganda.

References 

Uganda
 
Wars